Bennie Lee Cunningham, Jr. (December 23, 1954 – April 23, 2018) was an American professional football player who was a tight end for the Pittsburgh Steelers of the National Football League (NFL).  Cunningham was selected out of the Clemson University in the 1976 NFL Draft by the Steelers. During his career, he played in 118 games and caught 202 receptions for 2,879 yards and 20 touchdowns.

Cunningham's most famous play in the NFL was a game-winning touchdown in a Pittsburgh home game versus divisional rival Cleveland on September 24, 1978.  It came on a flea-flicker play, culminating in a pass from Terry Bradshaw to Cunningham, who caught the ball in the back right corner of the end zone.  It gave the Steelers a dramatic 15–9 victory over the Browns in sudden-death overtime.

On April 23, 2018, Cunningham died at age 63 at the Cleveland Clinic in Ohio, where he had been fighting cancer for about three months.

References

External links
 Cunningham's stats

1954 births
2018 deaths
American football tight ends
Clemson Tigers football players
Pittsburgh Steelers players
All-American college football players
People from Laurens, South Carolina
Players of American football from South Carolina